Luxembourg competed at the 1996 Summer Olympics in Atlanta, United States. Six competitors, two men and four women, took part in seven events in five sports.

Athletics

Fencing

One female fencer represented Luxembourg in 1996.

Women's épée
 Mariette Schmit

Judo

Shooting

Tennis

Women's Singles Competition
 Anne Kremer 
 First round — Lost to Lindsay Davenport (USA) 2-6 1-6

References

External links
Official Olympic Reports

Nations at the 1996 Summer Olympics
1996 Summer Olympics
1996 in Luxembourgian sport